Imagic was an American video game developer and publisher that created games initially for the Atari 2600. Founded in 1981 by corporate alumni of Atari, Inc. and Mattel, its best-selling titles were Atlantis, Cosmic Ark, and Demon Attack.  Imagic also released games for Intellivision, ColecoVision, Atari 8-bit family, TI-99/4A, IBM PCjr, VIC-20, Commodore 64, TRS-80 Color Computer, and Magnavox Odyssey².  Their Odyssey² ports of Demon Attack and Atlantis were the only third-party releases for that system in America. The company never recovered from the video game crash of 1983 and was liquidated in 1986.

History
Imagic was the second third-party publisher for the Atari 2600, formed after Activision.  Founders included Bill Grubb, Bob Smith, Rob Fulop, and Denis Koble from Atari, Inc., Jim Goldberger, Dave Durran and Brian Dougherty from Mattel as well as Pat Ransil and Gary Kato.
Grubb previously served as the vp of sales and marketing for Atari for 18 months. Before that, he was with the marketing department at Black and Decker for 11 years. It was Grubb's goal to take Imagic public and to eventually overtake Activision as the number one third-party video game publisher.

Atari sued Imagic over Demon Attack because of its resemblance to Phoenix, to which Atari had the exclusive home-version rights. The case was settled out of court.

Despite initial success and sales greater than projections, the company's fortunes reversed after the stock market dumped videogame stocks in late 1982, scuttling Imagic's initial plan to become a publicly traded company.

Fan club
During its height, Imagic ran a fan club for their games, the Numb Thumb Club, which published an annual newsletter. Only two issues were published before Imagic's demise in 1983.

Decline
Although Imagic grew quickly in its early years, it was irreparably harmed by the video game crash of 1983. It released 24 titles before going out of business by 1986, but the exact time it disbanded is unknown. In 1983, the company laid off 40 of their 170 employees but appeared at the 1984 Consumer Electronics Show with plans for four IBM PCjr games. The rights to Imagic's most popular titles have been owned by Activision since the late 1980s, and they have been re-released on several occasions.

Games

Imagic 2600 cartridges were distinct from both Activision and Atari cartridges with an extended ridge at the top of the cart.  Packaging was distinctive due to the use of reflective silver on the boxes, with a tapered, ridged end intended for an easy grip.  The years are for the original versions only, not subsequent ports.

1982
 Atlantis
 Cosmic Ark
 Demon Attack
 Dracula
 Dragonfire
 Fire Fighter
 Beauty & the Beast
 Microsurgeon
 Riddle of the Sphinx
 Swords & Serpents
 Star Voyager
 Trick Shot

1983
 Fathom
 Ice Trek
 Laser Gates
 Moonsweeper
 No Escape!
 Nova Blast
 Quick Step
 Safecracker
 Shootin' Gallery
 Solar Storm
 Subterranea
 Tropical Trouble
 Truckin'
 White Water!

1984
 Chopper Hunt, formerly Buried Bucks from ANALOG Software
 Injured Engine
 Touchdown Football
 Tournament Tennis
 Wing War

References

Atari 2600
Video game development companies
Video game companies established in 1981
Video game companies disestablished in 1986
Defunct video game companies of the United States
Defunct companies based in the San Francisco Bay Area